Russell Jones (14 April 1926 – 9 June 2019) was a British Orientalist who had researched Malay and Indonesian languages and culture in the broad sense. He is a noted scholar of pre-modern Malay literature, particularly when it comes to relating the texts to the manuscripts. His other interests include foreign influences on Malay and Indonesian, the Chinese in the Nanyang, and the history of papermaking. His research was focused on the paper and watermarks of Malay manuscripts.

Life and career 

His involvement with Indonesia and Malaysia resulted from the fortunate accident of being posted to South East Asia as a young soldier. He was born in England, near the Welsh border, and brought up on a farm in Shropshire. He left school at the age of 16, and since it was during World War II, at the age of eighteen he enlisted in the Royal Marines. A posting to Singapore in 1945, then to Batavia, Dutch East Indies, inspired a lasting interest in Malay and Indonesian. Being inspired to learn more about the Malay world he had discovered, on returning to England he studied Malay at the School of Oriental and African Studies in London.

For ten years, from 1948, he served in the Colonial Service, serving in the Federation of Malaya Immigration Department.  He was stationed amongst other places in Perlis and Kelantan, and in 1950 had the task of introducing immigration control for the first time in Johor. This was the time of the Emergency (the communist uprising), and security matters inevitably impinged on the work of the Immigration Department. For the latter part of his service he held the post of Senior Assistant Controller of Immigration at the headquarters in Penang.

His interest in Chinese arose during this period. He acquired a knowledge of the Hokkien dialect of Chinese (Minnanhua), and took the government examinations in spoken Amoy Hokkien following private tuition in Singapore and Penang. This enabled him to introduce a system of recording Chinese names in the department, based on the Chinese characters, and eventually led to the publication of a book on Chinese names, and another on Chinese loan-words in Malay and Indonesian.

Returning to Europe after Merdeka, he resumed his studies which included Malay, Dutch and Arabic languages, and Islamic history, in the School of Oriental and African Studies, followed by three years of doctoral research at the University of Leiden. In 1961 he went to Australia, where he was a lecturer in Malay in the Department of Indonesian and Malay Studies under F. H. van Naerssen at the University of Sydney until 1965. His subsequent academic career until he retired in 1984 was in SOAS, University of London, and where he subsequently remained an honorary Research Fellow. Altogether he published about sixty articles and books.

In 1973 he was instrumental in founding the international Indonesian Etymological Project, which gathered a corpus of about twenty thousand loan-words in Indonesian and Malay, leading to the publication of a book in 2007, and embodied in a web site in Bangkok, http://sealang.net/indonesia. Also in 1973 he was instrumental in founding a newsletter which over the years was transformed into the academic journal Indonesia and the Malay World, published by Routledge.

The preparation of his Ph.D., on the legend of the Sufi, Ibrahim ibn Adham, rested extensively on Malay (and some Arabic) manuscript sources. This and subsequent research into Malay manuscripts, nearly all written on Dutch or British or Italian paper, brought a realisation of the need to study the watermarks to establish  the date they were written, or copied. He soon found that this science of filigranology had a way of becoming an all-consuming passion for those who took it up. After more than forty years devoted to filigranology of Malay/Indonesian manuscripts he became something of an authority – perhaps the only one – on this neglected field. As he approached the end of his working life he dedicated himself to passing on his knowledge to the next generation of Indonesian and Malay codicologists.

In retirement, he lived in Cornwall, England.

Selected publications 
 Jones, Russell (1959) Chinese Names: Notes on the Use of Surnames and Personal Names by the Chinese in Malaya. Singapore: Malayan Branch of the Royal Asiatic Society. This offprint of the Society's Journal (Vol. XXXII, Part 3, Aug. 1959) is based on research carried in Penang in 1958-59 and covers components of names, variations in those, characters used, Western spellings and the changing of names and mainly concentrates on names used in Mandarin, Cantonese, Hokkien and Teochew.
 Jones, Russell. (1979) Ten Conversion Myths from Indonesia in N. Levtzion ed., "Conversion to Islam", pp. 129–58.
 Jones, Russell (1985) Hikayat Sultan Ibrahim Ibn Adham =: Ḥikāyat Sulṭān Ibrāhīm Ibn Adʹham : an Edition of an Anonymous Malay Text with Translation and Notes. Berkeley, Calif: Center for South and Southeast Asia Studies, University of California, Print.
 Jones, Russell, Carstairs Douglas, and Thomas Barclay. (2007) Loan-words in Indonesian and Malay. Leiden: KITLV Press.
 Jones, Russell. (1997) Chinese Names: The Traditions Surrounding the Use of Chinese Surnames and Personal Names. Petaling Jaya, Selangor Darul Ehsan, Malaysia: Pelanduk Publications

References

External links
 Dr Russell Jones at School of African and Oriental Studies
 "Malay manuscripts: a guide to paper and watermarks: The collected works of Russell Jones 1972–2015" in Indonesia and the Malay World, Volume 49, 2021 - Issue 144, pp. 139-394.
 References to Russell Jones's work in International Institute for Asian Studies newsletters
 Arabic Language in Contemporary Indonesian at PlanetMole - includes mention of Russell Jones's work Arabic Loan-Words in Indonesian

English orientalists
Linguists of Austronesian languages
Linguists of Malay
Linguists of Chinese
Codicologists
1926 births
2019 deaths